Patricio (Pato) Rodríguez (20 December 1938 — 23 June 2020) was a professional tennis player from Chile. He was active from 1956 until 1979 and won 23 career singles titles. In addition he won 2 doubles titles.

Career
Rodríguez was born in Santiago, Chile. In 1956 he played his first tournament at the South American Championships. In 1959 he won his first title at the Bad Neuenahr Open at Bad Neuenahr-Ahrweiler, Germany.

He also played in tennis Grand Slams and competed for his country in the Davis Cup in the 1960s and the 1970s. In 1970 he won the last of his 23 career singles titles at Pörtschach Championships.  In 1979 he played his last singles event at the Vina Del Mar tournament at Valparaíso, Chile. 

He also won two ATP doubles titles.

Career titles

Singles titles (23)

Doubles titles (2)

External links
 
 
 

Chilean male tennis players
Tennis players from Santiago
1938 births
2020 deaths
Tennis players at the 1967 Pan American Games
Pan American Games competitors for Chile